Season 1996–97 was the 113th football season in which Dumbarton competed at a Scottish national level, entering the Scottish Football League for the 91st time, the Scottish Cup for the 102nd time, the Scottish League Cup for the 50th time and the Scottish Challenge Cup for the seventh time.

Overview 
Despite the failures of the previous season, manager Jim Fallon retained his position and unfortunately that decision was to prove disastrous as the league campaign started off in the same poor manner as the previous one. By the end of October, Dumbarton had one win to show for 13 league matches, and had sunk to second bottom place, resulting in Fallon's resignation. Within a week Ian Wallace, one of the club's brightest stars of the 1970s, had been installed and things began to take a turn for the better. Three wins on the trot in November saw Wallace named as Second Division manager of the month, but it wasn't to last. Results began again to go downhill, but even with three games left it was within Dumbarton's own hands whether a second successive relegation would occur. A last minute defeat to Stranraer and an uninspiring loss to Queen of the South meant that they had to better any result that Stranraer could achieve on the last day. As it was, a win over Brechin City was not enough, and it would be Third Division football next season and the fourth tier of Scottish football for the first time in the club's history.

In the national cup competitions, the drought on wins extended for a fifth season. In the Scottish Cup Cowdenbeath defeated Dumbarton in the second round.

In the League Cup, Premier Division Dundee beat Dumbarton, also in the second round.

Finally, in the Challenge Cup, it was a seventh first round defeat in seven attempts – this time to Montrose.

Locally, in the Stirlingshire Cup the misery was compounded with a defeat to Falkirk.

Results & fixtures

Scottish Second Division

Scottish League Challenge Cup

Coca-Cola League Cup

Tennant's Scottish Cup

Stirlingshire Cup

Pre-season/Other Matches

League table

Player statistics

Squad 

|}

Transfers

Players in

Players out

Trivia
 The League match against Brechin City on 31 August marked Jim Marsland's 200th appearance for Dumbarton in all national competitions - the 25th Dumbarton player to break the 'double century'.
 The League match against Ayr United on 5 October marked Ian MacFarlane's 200th appearance for Dumbarton in all national competitions - the 26th Dumbarton player to break the 'double century'.
 The League match against Livingston on 19 April marked Colin McKinnon's 100th appearance for Dumbarton in all national competitions - the 110th Dumbarton player to reach this milestone.
 Dumbarton became only the second team in Scottish League history to be relegated in successive seasons.
 For the second successive season Dumbarton matched the record fewest league home wins during a season - just two!

See also
 1996–97 in Scottish football

References

External links
Derek Barnes (Dumbarton Football Club Historical Archive)
Peter Dennison (Dumbarton Football Club Historical Archive) 
Billy Davidson (Dumbarton Football Club Historical Archive)
Graeme McKenzie (Dumbarton Football Club Historical Archive)
David Reid (Dumbarton Football Club Historical Archive)
Joe Goldie (Dumbarton Football Club Historical Archive)
Adrian Mellis (Dumbarton Football Club Historical Archive) 
John Scott (Dumbarton Football Club Historical Archive)
Stephen Dallas (Dumbarton Football Club Historical Archive) 
Alan Granger (Dumbarton Football Club Historical Archive) 
Hrienn Hringsson (Dumbarton Football Club Historical Archive)
Ross McCuaig (Dumbarton Football Club Historical Archive)
Jim McGall (Dumbarton Football Club Historical Archive)
Scottish Football Historical Archive

Dumbarton F.C. seasons
Scottish football clubs 1996–97 season